Casimir-Joseph Davaine (19 March 1812 – 14 October 1882) was a French physician known for his work in the field of microbiology. He was a native of Saint-Amand-les-Eaux, department of Nord.

In 1850, Davaine along with French pathologist Pierre François Olive Rayer, discovered a certain microorganism in the blood of diseased and dying sheep. In the diseased blood, Rayer and Davaine observed the bacillus that is known today as Bacillus anthracis, the causative bacterium of anthrax. Soon afterwards, Rayer published a description of the bacillus in a paper titled, Inoculation du sang de rate (1850).

In 1863, Davaine demonstrated that the bacillus could be directly transmitted from one animal to another. He was able to identify the causative organism, but was unaware of its true etiology. Later on, German microbiologist Robert Koch investigated the etiology of Bacillus anthracis, and discovered its ability to produce "resting spores" that could stay alive in the soil for a long period of time to serve as a future source of infection.

Casimir Davaine is also credited for pioneer work in the study of sepsis (blood poisoning).

References

Further reading

1812 births
1882 deaths
People from Nord (French department)
19th-century French physicians
French microbiologists
Deaths from sepsis
Burials at Père Lachaise Cemetery